My Life Online (Mylo) was a device created and marketed by Sony for portable instant messaging and other Internet-based communications, browsing Internet web sites using the Opera web browser and playback and sharing of media files. The pocket-sized, tablet-shaped handheld device, which debuted in 2006, had a screen which slid up to reveal a QWERTY keyboard. The brand name 'Mylo' means My Life Online. Using Wi-Fi instead of cellular networks, the Mylo was targeted to the 18–24 age group.

By using WiFi networks for Internet connectivity, Mylo provided users with the possibility of reducing connectivity costs by avoiding the necessity of using GSM, CDMA or 3G cellular networks which would usually be used for devices of this size and functionality.

History and design 
Mylo COM–1
The first version of the Sony mylo was launched on September 15, 2006 and includes 1 GB of onboard flash memory and a Memory Stick PRO Duo expansion slot.

The mylo is 23.9 mm (31/32 in) thick, 123 mm (4⅞ in) wide, 63 mm (2½ in) tall, and sports a 6.1 cm (2.4 in) QVGA (320 × 240) LCD screen.  Its form factor is similar to the T-Mobile Sidekick in that it is held in landscape mode and has a slide out QWERTY keyboard.  Its initial model colors were a glossy black and white.

Mylo COM–2
On January 6, 2008, the second edition of the Sony mylo was announced at CES 2008 in Las Vegas. This version was based on PSP technology and included AIM, a touchscreen, and a camera. The Internet Browser was changed from Opera to NetFront. It supported Adobe Flash for viewing Flash content such as YouTube videos and for playing Flash-based games. The mylo COM–2 had 1 GB flash memory that could be used for music and video playback. Two colors were available: black and white. The mylo COM–2 featured wireless G connectivity. The keyboard was backlit as well. System software version 1.201 added support for video recording. The mylo COM–2 was released on SonyStyle.com on January 25, 2008 for $299. It was reduced to $199 before the holiday season and was quickly drawn from production due to its poor sales.

Software 

The mylo's menu of software applications is grouped by function.
Communication
The following applications in the main menu group use the Wi-Fi connection:
AIM. AOL Instant Messenger (COM–2 only)
Skype. Includes the features: Dial (Skype to phone), Call (Skype to Skype), Chat (instant messaging), and Send (and Receive) Files. Also can receive (phone to Skype).
Google Talk. Features text chats (instant messaging) with Google Talk and XMPP contacts. Included is a link to Gmail (WAP version).
Yahoo! Messenger. The text messaging application also includes a link to Yahoo! Mail (WAP version).
Ad Hoc Application. This Peer-to-peer lets the mylo share playlists and stream songs directly to another mylo.
Cannot be used natively for sending or receiving text (SMS) messages to or from cell phones; it is strictly for messenger and web only.

Web
COM–1. The Opera web browser allows a number of configurations to help minimize the limitations of the small screen (320x240) including Zoom (%), Text Size (Small, Normal, Large) and View Mode (Normal or Fit to Screen).

COM–2. NetFront with support for Flash Lite is the web browser that is supplied with the mylo COM–2.

Media
COM–1. The player supports the MP3, WMA (secured and unsecured) and ATRAC 3 audio formats. The image viewer supports JPG, PNG, and Bitmap formats. The video player supports the MPEG-4/AAC video format. The text application is a simple text editor.

COM–2. The player supports the MP3, WMA (secured and unsecured), AAC (no DRM) and ATRAC3 formats. The image viewers supports JPEG, PNG and BMP formats. The video player supports the MPEG-4/AAC Simple Profile and MPEG-4/AAC AVC H.264 baseline profile. It also supports WMV starting with firmware version 1.101, which was released in April 2008.

On both models DRM content in Windows Media Audio and Adaptive Transform Acoustic Coding 3 is limited to the internal 1GB memory. DRM playback is not possible via Memory Stick as Magic Gate is not available and Windows Media DRM is not currently possible on Memory Sticks.

Tools
 The utilities in this menu group include the Connection Manager for managing the Wi-Fi configuration, a File Manager, a firmware System Update tool.

Connectivity 
With the USB mode configuration set to the default (MSC) the mylo acts as a USB mass-storage device. Music and other files can then be transferred from a PC with the included SonicStage software or by dragging and dropping using a file manager.  With the USB mode set to MTP you can synchronize audio files via WMP 10.  While connected via USB, the mylo screen displays the USB mode currently in use and suspends whatever program had been running.

The 802.11b Wi-Fi connection is started either with the Wireless LAN slider button or automatically when one of mylo's Internet applications (i.e., Skype, Yahoo! Messenger, Google Talk, Opera) attempt to access the network and an infrastructure mode Wi-Fi connection has not yet been established. The Wi-Fi mode can be switched to Ad Hoc mode to enable use of the Ad Hoc Application.  Although the device is marketed for persons on the go, the Mylo does not have any commonly used Bluetooth capabilities, to provide easy connection with other wireless carrier enabled mobile devices.

Owners of the COM-1 model receive access to any T-Mobile Hotspot for the first year. Owners of the COM–2 model receive access to over 10,000 Wayport Hotspot locations nationwide, through December 31, 2010. Over 9,000 of these locations are McDonald's restaurants.

Mylo models

Specifications 
Processor: Freescale i.MX21 (for the COM–1)

As a device, the mylo COM– 1 sports a 2.4-inch 320 by 240 LCD display, 400 MB for flash memory (upgradable to 4 GB), mini-USB connectivity, a Memory Stick Duo slot, integrated 802.11b wireless networking (supporting WEP and WPA-PSK security), and a lithium-ion battery offering up to 45 hours of music playback, 8 hours of video time, and up to 76 hours of VoIP talk time. Add to that a DC input for charging or running "wired" with the AC adapter, a 10-pin headphone/microphone interface (an adapter is included), a slide-out QWERTY keyboard for composing messages, and a total weight of about 157 grams (5.4 ounces), including the battery.

See also 
 PlayStation Portable

References

External links 
 Sony mylo Review With Video Demo
 Sony mylo Video Encoding Guide Using Free PSPvideo9 
 Sony Mylo COM2 review Sony Mylo COM2 review
 Sony "mylo" "COM-2" disassembly report, hardware details published in Japanese by the developers.  A Web based translation is available.

Sony consoles
Sony products
Information appliances
Linux-based devices
Embedded Linux
Linux-based video game consoles
ARM-based video game consoles